This is a partial list of Korean women writers.

B
Bae Suah (born 1965), novelist, short story writer

C
Cha Meeyoung (born 1979), mathematician and computer scientist
Cheon Un-yeong (born 1971), novelist
Choe Yun (born 1953), novelist
Choi Eunmi (born 1978), novelist
Choi Jeongrye (1955–2021), poet
Chung Bora (born 1972), short story writer, novelist, translator

E
Eun Meehee (born 1960), novelist, columnist, educator

G
Gong Ji-young (born 1963), novelist
Gong Sun-ok (born 1963), novelist, short story writer

H
Ha Seong-nan (born 1967), short story writer, novelist
Han Kang (born 1970), poet, short story writer, novelist, educator
Han Malsook (born 1931), novelist
Han Moo-sook (1918–1993), novelist
Hee Geum (1979)
Heo Nanseolheon (1563–1589), prominent poet of the mid-Joseon dynasty
Heo Su-gyeong (born 1964), poet
Hong Yun-suk (1925–2015), acclaimed poet
Lady Hyegyeong (1735–1816), crown princess and memoirist of the late-Joseon dynasty
Hwang In-suk (born 1958), poet
Hwang Sun-mi (born 1963), children's writer
Hwang Jin-i (c. 1506–1560), poet, wrote in the sijo verse form
 Hwang Jung-eun (1967), author, podcaster
Yun-I Hyeong (1967)

I
Im Yunjidang (1721–1793), scholar, philosopher, non-fiction writer

J
Jang Eun-jin (born 1976), novelist, short story writer
Jon Kyongnin (born 1962), poet, novelist, focus on sexuality
Jo Kyung-ran (born 1969), non-fiction writer
Jung Eun-gwol, since 2004, novelist
Jung Ihyun (born 1972), novelist
Jung Mikyung (born 1960), novelist, short story writer

K
Kang Kyeong-ae (1906–1944), novelist, poet, feminist
Kang Sok-kyong (born 1951), novelist
Kang Young-sook (born 1967), short story writer, novelist
Kim Aeran (born 1980), short story writer, best selling novelist
Kim Byeol-ah (born 1969), historical novelist
Kim Chae-won (born 1946), short story writer, novelist
Kim Chi-won (1943–2013), short story writer, novelist
Kim Hu-ran (born 1934), poet, journalist

Kang Hwa-gil (born 1986), gothic fiction and feminist writer

Kim Hyesoon (born 1955), poet
Kim Insuk (born 1963), novelist, short story writer
Kim Myeong-sun (1896–1951), novelist, short story writer, poet
Kim Myǒngmi (born 1957), Korean-American poet
Kim Nam-jo (born 1927), poet
Kim Ryeo-ryeong (born 1971), children's writer, novelist
Kim Sagwa (born 1984), novelist, short story writer
Kim Seon-wu (born 1970), feminist poet
Kim Seung-hee (born 1952), poet, essayist, novelist
Kwon Teckyoung, literary critic
Kwon Yeo-sun (born 1965), novelist, short story writer

L
Lee Hye-gyeong (born 1960), novelist
Hayeon Lim (born 1993), socialite and author

M
Moon Chung-hee (born 1947), poet
Moh Youn-sook (1910–1990), Korea's best-known female poet

N
Na Hye-sok (1896–1948), poet, feminist writer, painter, educator, journalist
Noh Cheonmyeong (1912–1957), poet

O
Oh Jung-hee (born 1947), short story writer
Oh Soo-yeon (born 1964), novelist, short story writer

P
Pak Hwasŏng (1904–1988), novelist, short story writer, essayist
Park Kyung-ni (1926–2008), prominent novelist
Park Wansuh (1931–2011), novelist

R
Ra Heeduk (born 1966), poet

S
Seo Hajin (born 1960), short story writer, novelist
Shin Kyung-sook (born 1963), short story writer, novelist
Sim Yunkyung (born 1972), popular novelist
So Young-en (born 1943), short story writer
Son Bo-mi (born 1980), novelist
Son Sohui (1917–1987), novelist, short story writer

U
Uhwudong (c.1440–1480), dancer, poet, wrote in sijo verse

Y
Yang Gui-ja (born 1955), novelist
Yeo Ok (from the ancient Gojoseon kingdom), author of the poem Gonghuin (A Medley for the Harp)
Yi Bingheogak (fl.1809), published  the women's encyclopaedia Guyhap chongseo 
Yi Geun-hwa (born 1976), poet, educator
Yi Kyoung-ja (born 1948), short story writer, novelist
Yoo An-jin (born 1941), poet, essayist, educator
Yun Ko-eun (born 1980), novelist

See also
List of women writers

-
Korean
Writers
Writers, women